On February 8, 2012, rebels from the separatist Movement for the National Liberation of Azawad attacked a military outpost in Tinzaouaten located on the Algerian borderline. The battle led to the capture of the city by rebel forces of the National Movement for the Liberation of Azawad. A Malian government statement was released the following day declaring a "strategic withdrawal" from its base in Tinzaouaten. A Malian soldier was killed. Ten were captured and 37 defected and were retrieved by Algerian authorities.

The battle
On February 7, 2012, the city of Tinzawatene was attacked by the rebels. Malian forces managed to repel the initial attack after several hours of combat, but the city was captured by the rebels the next day. According to MNLA spokesman Hama Ag Sid'Ahmed, the separatists took control of two military camps in the city and took several military vehicles. The Malian army withdrew the garrison to Algeria, but denied defeat by referring to the move as a "strategic retreat". On March 20, Ansar Dine also claimed to have control of Tinzawatene.

Aftermath
According to the report released by the MNLA, more than 34 Malian soldiers fled to Algeria, 5 were wounded, 10 taken prisoner (including an officer), against a single wounded soldier on their side. The separatists also claimed to have captured several vehicles. Spokesman Hama Ag Sid'Ahmed, however, mentions both dead and injured in the ranks of the MNLA. According to an unnamed official Malian source, there was no fighting or loss of life as the army decided to abandon the isolated positions for tactical reasons. However, according to Reuters, the Malian government indicates in a statement on February 8 that one soldier was killed and two others wounded.

References

2012 in Mali
Tinzaouaten
Tinzaouaten
February 2012 events in Africa

Tinzaouaten